Maulana Abdul Ghafoor Haideri (born ) is a Pakistani politician. He has served as the Deputy Chairman of the Senate of Pakistan since 12 March 2015 and has been the central General Secretary of the Jamiat Ulama-e-Islam party since 1995.

Early life and education
Haideri was born in June 1957 and received his early education in his village.

In 1979, he completed his religious education and passed examinations from the Examination Board of Wafaq-ul-Madaris Al-Arabia.

Political career
Haideri was active in Tehrik-e-Khatm-e-Nabowat in 1974 and Tehreek Nizam-e-Mustafa in 1977, for which police twice imprisoned him. In 1983, he was elected General Secretary of the Jamiat Ulema-e-Islam (F) party in Quetta district. He got himself arrested a third time on 14 August 1983 in Manan square in Quetta during the Movement for the Restoration of Democracy's campaign to 'Fill the Prisons' and destabilize President Zia ul-Haq's government. The military sentenced him to ten lashes and one year in Sibi prison.

He opened the Jamia Shah Wali Ullah school in Kalat in October 1984, teaching there from 1985 to 1990.

He was elected to the Provincial Assembly of Balochistan in 1990 Pakistani general election and served as a provincial minister of Balochistan.

He ran for the Chief Minister of Balochistan in  1992 Pakistani general election but lost by one vote.

In  1993 Pakistani general election, he was elected to the National Assembly of Pakistan from Qalat constituency.

In 2001, Haideri campaigned against Pakistan's cooperation with the US government's Global War on Terror, touring the country and earning his fourth arrest, this time on seven counts of mutiny. He spent five months in jail in Quetta before winning another election to the National Assembly.

In 2015, he was elected to the Senate of Pakistan,
[He again elected for senate in 2021 and nominated for deputy chairman of senate by PDM but lost to Mirza Afridi] .

Counter-terrorism 
In 2013, he became the Minister of State for Postal Services. "Speaking at a press conference here on Tuesday, Maulana Haideri, who is Minister of State for Postal Services, condemned the terrorist attack on a school in Peshawar and said the state had no right to suspend the death penalty. JUI-F General Secretary Maulana Abdul Ghafoor Haideri has said that a moratorium on death penalty is encouraging terrorists and has limited counter-terrorism action in the country." Abdul Ghafoor Haideri maintains, "Only a victim's kin has the right to pardon the killer with or without taking compensation. This is an Islamic way of justice and being an ideological state, Pakistan should have Islamic laws."

In March 2015, he won a seat in the Senate and later took oath as deputy chairman senate. He is expected to serve in that capacity till March 2021.

In February 2017, Haideri was refused a visa by US authorities. He was scheduled to head a two-member delegation to an Inter Parliamentary Union meeting at the United Nations in New York.

On 12 May 2017, he managed to escape in an ISIL bombing shortly after the end of Friday prayers near the town of Mastung that targeted him; he was lightly wounded by pieces of glass from the windscreen of his car.

References

1957 births
Living people
Pakistani senators (14th Parliament)
Deobandis
Jamiat Ulema-e-Islam (F) politicians
Pakistani MNAs 1993–1996
Pakistani MNAs 2002–2007
Federal ministers of Pakistan
Balochistan MPAs 1990–1993
People from Kalat District
Deputy chairmen of the Senate of Pakistan